John Charles White (born November 1975) is an American educator and public official who served as the Louisiana Superintendent of Education from 2012 to 2020.

Education 
White received a B.A. in English with distinction from the University of Virginia and a Master's in Public Administration from New York University's Robert F. Wagner Graduate School of Public Service. He serves as chairman of the independent non-profit advocacy organization Chiefs for Change, co-founder and chairman of Propel America, and Academic Visitor to the John F. Kennedy School of Government at Harvard University.

Pre-Louisiana career 
Prior to being named State Superintendent, White served as Superintendent of the Louisiana Recovery School District. He previously worked under Mayor Michael Bloomberg and Chancellor Joel Klein as Deputy Chancellor for the New York City Department of Education and served as Executive Director of Teach For America – Chicago and Teach For America – New Jersey. He began his career as an English teacher at William L. Dickinson High School in Jersey City, New Jersey.

Louisiana State Superintendent 
White was appointed to the state superintendent position in January 2012 by the Louisiana Board of Elementary and Secondary Education. That year he launched Louisiana Believes., the state’s plan to ensure every child is on track to college or a professional career. In the time since, White has worked to unify the state’s fragmented early childhood system., to modernize curriculum., to professionalize the preparation of educators., to provide pathways to prosperity for all high school graduates., and to provide families with expansive school options irrespective of their financial means. White announced his resignation on January 8, 2020, effective March 11, 2020.

Louisiana Believes includes nationally recognized initiatives. such as Early Childhood Networks, Louisiana Teacher Leaders, English language arts Curriculum Guidebooks, the Believe and Prepare Teacher Residency, and Jump Start career education. Superintendent White and his team have also led the post-Katrina renovation and unification of schools in New Orleans and the creation of the Baton Rouge Achievement Zone.

Louisiana’s class of 2018 included 5,000 more graduates than did the class of 2012. Five thousand more students in that class earned the state’s TOPS scholarship, and 5,000 more enrolled in college after graduating high school. In that time, the number of Louisiana students earning Advanced Placement early college credits has increased by 167 percent, and the state leads the nation in the percentage of high school seniors completing an application for higher education financial aid.

Other activities 
White’s writings on education have been published in The Washington Post, the Wall Street Journal, the Daily Beast, The Hill, and the Brookings Institution’s Evidence Speaks.

References

1975 births
Living people
Educators from New Jersey
Educators from Louisiana
People from Washington, D.C.
People from Jersey City, New Jersey
Politicians from Chicago
Politicians from New York City
People from New Orleans
People from Baton Rouge, Louisiana
Louisiana State Superintendents of Education
Louisiana Independents
St. Albans School (Washington, D.C.) alumni
University of Virginia alumni
Robert F. Wagner Graduate School of Public Service alumni
Teach For America alumni
Educators from New York City
Educators from Illinois